Ucita, or Uçita may refer to :

 the place and former chiefdom Uzita (Florida), also called Uçita
 as acronym UCITA : Uniform Computer Information Transactions Act